Leonardus is a Latinized version of the Germanic name masculine name Leonard. Leonardus has been a relatively common birth name in the Netherlands, though most people use(d) a short form in daily life, like Leen, Leendert, Lennaert, Lennard, Lennart, Lennert, Lennie, Leo, Leon, Leonard and Lon.

Latinized name
Sanctus Leonardus (died 559 AD), Frankish noble, abbot and Christian saint
Leonardus Achates (Leonhard Agtstein; f.1472–1491), Swiss printer in Italy
Leonardus Bruni Aretinus (Leonardi Bruni; c.1370–1444), Italian humanist, historian and statesman
Leonardus Lessius (Lenaert Leijs; 1554–1623), Flemish Jesuit theologian
Leonardus Roselli (died 1606), Italian bishop
Leonardus Vincius (1452–1519), Leonardo da Vinci

Birth name
Leonardus Petrus "Leo" Beukeboom (born 1943), Dutch signpainter and lettering artist 
Leonardus L.J. "Leo" de Bever (1930–2015), Dutch architect
Leonardus Bramer (1596–1674), Dutch painter
 (1942–2008), Dutch bishop in Ethiopia
Leonardus "Léon" Dolmans (born 1945), Belgian footballer
Petrus Leonardus "Leo" Ehlen (1953–2016), Dutch footballer
Leonardus J.P.M. "Léon" Frissen (born 1950), Dutch Queen's Commissioner of Limburg
Leonardus Eustachius "Leen" Jansen (1930–2014), Dutch boxer
Leonardus F.E. "Leon" Kantelberg (born 1978), Dutch footballer
Leonardus Gerardus Kortenhorst (1886–1963), Dutch President of the House of Representatives
Leonardus van der Laan (1864–1942), Dutch architect
Leonardus Antonius Lightenvelt (1795–1873), Dutch Minister of Justice and of Foreign Affairs
Jan Leonardus "Lennie" Louw (born 1959), South African-born Namibian cricketer
Leonardus Benjamin Moerdani (1932–2004), Indonesian general and Minister of Defense
Leonardus Nardus (1868–1955), Dutch fencer
 (1699–1779), German-born Dutch librarian and university president
Leonardus J.H. “Leo” Passage (1936–2011), Dutch-born American hairstylist, educator, innovator and philanthropist
Leonardus P.P. "Lon" Pennock (born 1945), Dutch sculptor, monumental artist and photographer
Leonardus Syttin (1892–?), Lithuanian sport shooter
Leonardus Cornelius van der Valck (1769–1845), Dutch diplomat and mysterious count in Germany
Leonardus Q.M. "Leo" van Vliet (born 1955), Dutch road racing cyclist
 (1762–1809), Dutch politician of the Batavian Republic

See also
Leonardus, fossil mammalian genus
Leonardo (given name)

Dutch masculine given names
Latin masculine given names